Acompsia ponomarenkoae is a moth of the family Gelechiidae which can be found in Albania and Greece.

The forewings of the males are plain light brown, with scattered black brown scales. The hindwings are grey. Females have dark brown forewings, overlaid with lighter brown scales. The hindwings are grey. Adults are on wing from late May to late July.

Etymology
The species is named for Dr. Margarita Ponomarenko who discovered its distinctness independently of the scientists who described the species.

References

Moths described in 2002
Moths of Europe
Acompsia